is a Japanese pop singer. Born and raised in Toyota, Aichi, Mitsuoka debuted in the girl group Sister Q under the stage name MASAMI in 2005. After the group disbanded of unknown reasons in October 2006, she signed a contract with Pony Canyon and released her debut solo single "Hana" in 2007 under her real name.

Mitsuoka's fourth single "Last Cross", the theme song for Katekyō Hitman Reborn!, was released on December 17, 2008, and charted at number thirteen on the Oricon weekly charts. It became her best selling single with a total of 13,470 copies sold. Her first studio album, Black Diary, was released on January 28, 2009. In August 2009, she announced on her official website and blog that she will be changing her stage name, music style, and record label. Mitsuoka thus became known under the stage name Mizca and began releasing electropop music under the label Nippon Crown. Now produced by pal@pop, Mizca released her first digital single "Robotics" was on October 28, 2009. Her first studio album as Mizca, UFUFU, was released on July 21, 2010.

Mitsuoka went back to her previous name and music style in 2011, and released her second album PAST TRUNK on January 11, 2012, her first studio album as Masami Mitsuoka in three years.

Discography

Studio albums

Singles

Digital releases

References

External links
 Official website
 Official blog
 

1986 births
People from Toyota, Aichi
Japanese women pop singers
Living people
Musicians from Aichi Prefecture
21st-century Japanese singers
21st-century Japanese women singers